Mārtiņš Meiers (born 30 March 1991) is a Latvian professional basketball player for BC Kalev/Cramo of the Latvian-Estonian Basketball League and the FIBA Europe Cup.

Professional career
Meiers had a breakout year in his second season with VEF Rīga averaging 13.7ppg in the VTB United League. On February 5, 2017, Meiers had a 31-point performance against Zenit.

Meiers spent the 2019-20 season with Budućnost VOLI of the ABA League. He signed with BC Astana on 1 September 2020.

On 16 February 2021 he signed with Élan Chalon of the LNB Pro A.

On November 10, 2021, he has signed with Śląsk Wrocław of the Polish Basketball League.

National team career 
Meiers has represented the Latvian national team in EuroBasket 2011, EuroBasket 2013, EuroBasket 2015 and EuroBasket 2017.

References

External links
FIBA Europe profile

1991 births
Living people
BC Astana players
BC Enisey players
BC UNICS players
BK Liepājas Lauvas players
BK VEF Rīga players
BK Ventspils players
Centers (basketball)
KK Budućnost players
Latvian expatriate basketball people in Germany
Latvian men's basketball players
Mitteldeutscher BC players
People from Jūrmala
Śląsk Wrocław basketball players
Latvian expatriate basketball people in Estonia